Lola Artôt de Padilla (5 October 1876 or 1880 - 12 April 1933) was a French-Spanish soprano, renowned in Germany, where she mainly sang.

Biography

Lola Artôt de Padilla was born in Sèvres near Paris as Dolores de Padilla.  Her year of birth is given as either 1880 or 1876.  Her mother was the Belgian-born soprano Désirée Artôt (de Padilla), and her father was a well-known Spanish baritone, Mariano Padilla y Ramos.  (They had married in 1869 while Désirée Artôt was still informally engaged to Pyotr Ilyich Tchaikovsky, but she did not inform him she had changed her mind.) Her godmother was her mother's singing teacher  Pauline Viardot.  She exhibited her vocal ability at a young age, but not her mother's fiery temperament.

Her mother was her sole singing teacher.  She made an unofficial debut in Paris and her major debut at the Hoftheater Wiesbaden in 1902 in the title role of Thomas's Mignon and from 1905 until 1908 she sang at the Komische Oper Berlin. From 1909 until 1927 she worked at the Berliner Hofoper (Imperial Opera).  She also performed in other cities in Germany and in the Netherlands, Paris, Scandinavia and Poland.

Lola Artôt de Padilla created the role of Vreli (Juliet) in Frederick Delius's A Village Romeo and Juliet (Berlin, 21 February 1907).

She was the first in Berlin to sing the title roles in Busoni's opera Turandot  and Richard Strauss's Der Rosenkavalier (Strauss considered her the best Octavian he had ever heard), the Composer in Strauss's Ariadne auf Naxos, and the Goosegirl in Engelbert Humperdinck's Königskinder (European premiere, 14 January 1911).

She was famous for her interpretation of Cherubino in The Marriage of Figaro and Zerlina in Don Giovanni, both by Mozart (her father Mariano Padilla y Ramos had himself been a renowned Don Giovanni).  Her repertory also included the Countess in The Marriage of Figaro, Marie in Smetana's The Bartered Bride, Charlotte in Massenet's Werther, Micaela in Bizet's Carmen, and Oscar in Verdi's Un ballo in maschera.

Lola Artôt de Padilla died in Berlin in 1933, aged either 52 or 56, and is buried at the Südwestfriedhof, Stahnsdorf.

Recordings
She made a number of recordings and she appears in EMI's The Record of Singing.

References

External links
 Historic Opera

19th-century births
1933 deaths
People from Sèvres
French operatic sopranos
20th-century French women opera singers